Alexander Logan (1882 – 10 October 1918) was a Scottish footballer, who played for clubs including Hibernian, Aston Villa, Falkirk (two spells), Bristol City and Kilmarnock.

Career
Born in Barrhead, Logan began his senior career with local club Barrhead Fereneze before signing for Hibernian, one of the leading clubs in Scotland, in 1902. He was a member of the squad which won the 1902–03 Scottish Division One championship title, although he only featured in two league matches and had been loaned to Airdrieonians in January 1903 until the end of the campaign; the Lanarkshire club won the lower division and gained promotion, but the extent of his involvement is uncertain.

He went out on loan again for the next two seasons to hometown club Arthurlie, also of the second tier. He remained with Hibernian for 1905–06 but did not appear in any competitive fixtures for the Leith side and moved on permanently to Falkirk in summer 1906. His form at the Brockville Park club took an immediate upturn (14 goals in 25 league matches) which was such that he came into contention for international selection, and after less than a full season with the Bairns before he was signed by top English club Aston Villa, where his younger brother James had already been playing in the defence for two years.

Logan was involved for two-and-a-half seasons at Villa Park (the club finished runners-up in 1907–08) but despite a decent scoring record he was unable to secure a regular place in the team, and returned to Falkirk in the summer of 1909. Once again, he performed well for the club and in 1909–10 they missed out on the Scottish League title by two points (meanwhile in England his former club Aston Villa and brother James did win the championship). 

Falkirk then signed another younger Logan brother, Tommy, although the siblings were teammates only for a matter of months before Alec's form again attracted the attention of English clubs, this time moving to Bristol City in December 1910. The club suffered relegation from the top tier at the end of his first season, and midway through the second he transferred back to Scotland with Kilmarnock. After a year in Ayrshire, he again moved on during the winter, this time to Partick Thistle.

International
Logan was never selected for the full Scotland team. He represented the Scottish Football League XI twice: a goalless draw against the English League at Ibrox Park in March 1907 and a 3–1 win over the Irish League, in which he scored, in October 1910 at Belfast. The call-ups came during each of his brief but effective spells at Falkirk.

Wartime and death
The outbreak of World War I ended Logan's professional football career aged 32. His military service included time with the Queen's Own Cameron Highlanders for whose regimental football team he was selected in November 1914. He was serving with the 2nd Battalion Argyll and Sutherland Highlanders when he died of wounds at No. 30 Casualty Clearing Station on 10 October 1918 during the Second Battle of Cambrai.

Honours
Aston Villa
Football League First Division: Runner-up 1907–08

Falkirk
Scottish Football League: Runner-up 1909–10

Notes

References

1882 births
1918 deaths
Scottish footballers
Association football forwards
People from Barrhead
Arthurlie F.C. players
Airdrieonians F.C. (1878) players
Kilmarnock F.C. players
Falkirk F.C. players
Partick Thistle F.C. players
Scottish Football League players
English Football League players
Aston Villa F.C. players
Bristol City F.C. players
Scottish Football League representative players
British Army personnel of World War I
British military personnel killed in World War I
Queen's Own Cameron Highlanders soldiers
Argyll and Sutherland Highlanders soldiers